Fun Spot or Funspot may refer to:

Places

United States 
 Fun Spot America Theme Parks, a group of amusement parks located in Florida:
 Fun Spot America (Kissimmee) (formerly Fun Spot USA)
 Fun Spot America (Orlando) (formerly Fun Spot Action Park)
 Fun Spot Amusement Park & Zoo, located in Angola, Indiana, closed in 2008
 Funspot Family Fun Center, a video arcade at Weirs Beach, Laconia, New Hampshire